Ethel Redner Scull (1921 – August 27, 2001, age 79) was an American art collector, best known for the collection of pop and minimal art that she assembled with her then husband, Robert Scull.

Early life
Ethel Redner was born into a prosperous family in the Bronx in 1921. She led a privileged life and studied advertising art at the Parsons School of Design. Her father, Ben Redner, owned a successful taxicab company that she and her husband, Robert Scull, would inherit and run together under the name "Scull's Angels."

Marriage
Ethel Redner married Robert Scull, and they had three sons, Jonathan, Stephen and Adam. Robert Scull inherited a share of Redner's father's taxi cab company following Mr. Redner's retirement. After accumulating wealth in the taxi industry the couple broke into the art scene by collecting abstract and contemporary art. With the revenue from their first auction in 1965, they established the Robert and Ethel Scull Foundation, the primary goal of which was to support young artists by buying their art and paying for rent and other living expenses. Soon the Sculls began to draw criticism of their accumulated wealth from auctions of works in their collection, which they had usually purchased for little money and sometimes sold at prices as high as triple the original price. The Sculls' marriage deteriorated, and they filed for divorce in 1975. In 1986, Robert Scull died.

Commissions
Ethel Scull was the subject of Ethel Scull 36 Times, a 1963 painting by the American artist Andy Warhol, currently in the collection of the Metropolitan Museum of Art. It was Warhol's first commissioned work. The work consists of a grid of four rows of nine columns depicting Scull in 36 different poses. The artwork is jointly owned by the Whitney Museum of American Art and the Metropolitan Museum of Art.

Another notable commission Scull made was a George Segal portrait sculpture titled Portrait of Robert and Ethel Scull. The plaster sculpture features Scull wearing sunglasses sitting in a Victorian chair with Robert Scull standing behind her. This artwork is currently in the collection of Aichi Prefectural Museum of Art Segal cast Scull in two separate casts the first being from her neck down. Scull's boots continue to be stuck inside the sculpture.

Death and legacy
In 2001, while living in a retirement home in Manhattan, New York, Scull suffered from a heart attack that was followed by a stroke that resulted in her death. Scull has been immortalized as "the Mom of Pop Art." She and her husband were also the subject of significant criticism because of their accumulated wealth from trading in works of art by living artists who themselves saw no share of any realized profits. In particular, the October 18, 1973 Sotheby's Parke Bernet auction is recalled as a major money maker for the couple; in it, one of their art pieces, originally purchased from a still-living artist for $900, sold for $85,000. The Sculls saw themselves as fostering the careers of unknown artists; their critics accused them of profiteering and social climbing. In retrospect, it is clear that Ethel Scull was a forerunner and pioneer in the business of selling contemporary and pop art, and her legacy lives on in artworks such as Ethel Scull 36 Times by Andy Warhol.

References

1921 births
2001 deaths
American art collectors
Women art collectors
People from the Bronx